Pretty Smart is a 1987 American comedy-drama film starring Tricia Leigh Fisher and Patricia Arquette. It was directed by Dimitri Logothetis. It was Arquette's first film. It was mostly filmed in Athens with most interiors and some exteriors at the Hotel Grande Bretagne. Music was written and produced by Jay Levy and Ed Arkin.

Plot
In an effort to curb her wild antics, the parents of Zig (Tricia Leigh Fisher) send her to the Ogilvy Academy, an elite boarding school in Greece, along with her well-behaved fraternal twin sister Jennifer (Lisa Lörient). Determined to be expelled at the earliest opportunity, Zig will go to extreme lengths to have her way.

Cast
 Tricia Leigh Fisher as Daphne "Zig" Ziegler
 Lisa Lörient as Jennifer Ziegler
 Patricia Arquette as Zero
 Dennis Cole as Richard Crawley
 Elizabeth Davis as Diane
 Kimberly B. Delfin as Yuko
 Joely Fisher as Averil
 Charlotte-Michele Grenzer as Michelle
 Syndle Kirkland as Andrea
 Holly Nelson as Jessica
 Julie Kristen Smith as Samantha Falconwright
 Paris Vaughan as Torch
 Kim Waltrip as Sara Gentry
 Philece Sampler as Beth

DVD release
Pretty Smart was released on Region 2 DVD in 2005 by Boulevard Entertainment.

References

External links
 
 
 

1987 films
1980s coming-of-age comedy-drama films
1980s teen comedy-drama films
American coming-of-age comedy-drama films
American independent films
American teen comedy-drama films
1987 independent films
New World Pictures films
Films set in Greece
Films shot in Athens
Films directed by Dimitri Logothetis
1980s English-language films
1980s American films